The 2010 Open Prévadiès Saint–Brieuc was a professional tennis tournament played on outdoor red clay courts. It was part of the 2010 ATP Challenger Tour. It took place in Saint-Brieuc, France between 29 March and 4 April 2010.

ATP entrants

Seeds

Rankings are as of March 22, 2010.

Other entrants
The following players received wildcards into the singles main draw:
  Charles-Antoine Brézac
  Romain Jouan
  Benoît Paire
  Olivier Patience

The following players received entry from the qualifying draw:
  Laurynas Grigelis
  Samuel Groth
  Florian Reynet
  Charles Roche

Champions

Singles

 Michał Przysiężny def.  Rubén Ramírez Hidalgo, 4–6, 6–2, 6–3

Doubles

 Uladzimir Ignatik /  David Marrero def.  Brian Battistone /  Ryler DeHeart, 4–6, 6–4, [10–5]

References
French Tennis Federation International Tournaments official website
ITF Search 

Open Prevadies Saint-Brieuc
Saint-Brieuc Challenger
2010 in French tennis
March 2010 sports events in France
April 2010 sports events in France